Live in 1965 a live album by psychedelic folk band The Holy Modal Rounders, released on January 21, 2003, through DBK Works.

Track listing 
All songs are traditional, except where noted.

Personnel 

The Holy Modal Rounders
Peter Stampfel – fiddle, banjo, vocals
Steve Weber – guitar, vocals

Additional musicians and production
Tom Abbs – production
Miles Bachman – design
Michael Sanzone – design

References 

2003 live albums
ESP-Disk live albums
The Holy Modal Rounders albums
Don Giovanni Records albums